This is a list of festivals in Michigan.

References

 
Michigan
Festivals
Michigan